Florencio Varela could refer to:

Florencio Varela (writer), Argentine writer, journalist and educator
Florencio Varela, Buenos Aires, a town named after the writer
Florencio Varela Partido, the administrative district of the town